Axholme Charterhouse or Axholme Priory, also Melwood Priory or Low Melwood Priory, North Lincolnshire, is one of the ten medieval Carthusian houses (charterhouses) in England. It was established in 1397/1398 by Thomas Mowbray, Earl of Nottingham and later Duke of Norfolk. The house was centred on a pre-existing chapel on the present Low Melwood Farm, between Owston Ferry and Epworth in the Isle of Axholme, which according to a papal bull of 1398 "was called anciently the Priory of the Wood".

The full name of the monastery was The House of the Visitation of the Blessed Virgin Mary.

The prior, Saint Augustine Webster, was imprisoned in the Tower of London in 1535 for refusing the Oath of Supremacy and later martyred and canonised.

The monastery was suppressed during the Dissolution of the Monasteries in June 1538.

Afterwards the buildings were converted by John Candysshe into a house: parts still survive as do some earthworks. There has been limited excavation.

Priors of Axholme
John Moreby, elected 1398
Henry, occurs 1449
Richard, occurs 1469  and 1472
Augustine Webster, 1535
Michael Mekeness, 1535 to 1538

See also
List of monastic houses in Lincolnshire
List of monastic houses in England
Monks Kirby Priory

References

Lincolnshire Architectural & Archaeological Society
Glyn Coppack and Mick Aston, nd: Christ's Poor Men - the Carthusians in England 

1390s establishments in England
1538 disestablishments in England
Carthusian monasteries in England
Buildings and structures in Lincolnshire
Christian monasteries established in the 14th century
Archaeological sites in Lincolnshire
Monasteries dissolved under the English Reformation
Monasteries in Lincolnshire
Religiously motivated violence in England
Ruined abbeys and monasteries
Ruins in Lincolnshire
1397 establishments in England